Elections were held in Podgorica, the capital of Montenegro, on 23 October 2022, to elect members of the City Assembly. 8 groups ran for 58 seats in the City Assembly, with a 3% election threshold required to win seats.

Electoral system 
Voters in Podgorica determine the composition of the City Assembly, which in turn elects the Mayor. This means that the Mayor is only indirectly elected by the voters. Only parties which reach an electoral threshold of 3% may enter the Assembly. The Mayor may or may not be a councillor of the Assembly. The Assembly's composition is subject to a 4-year election cycle.

Campaign 
Although some campaigns make local promises, most campaigns still address national topics due to high political polarisation in Montenegro.

Europe Now, a new economically liberal movement, nominated Jakov Milatović, economist and popular minister of the 42nd Cabinet, to run for mayor. The party is running on an anti-corruption platform, focused on overthrowing the ruling DPS. Along with this focus, ES also wants to increase tourism in Podgorica and build a new business district.

The Democrats' coalition is also mostly focused on overthrowing DPS, barely addressing local topics.

The URA coalition has many proposals, focused around making Podgorica greener, such as to stop current transformations of forests and parks. They plan to make a tram system, as the only public transport Podgorica has right now are buses. Most other campaigns, mainly the DPS campaign, backs this, but claims it is too expensive to build and must be postponed until Montenegro joins the EU. In their campaign pamphlet, they also plan to close off the Old Town, currently barely walkable, as well as the city centre, and build underground parking lots in both parts of the city.

The DF-led coalition's composition shows the alliance's shift to the right, with politicians such as radical conservative, Christian fundamentalist and pro-Russian Vladislav Dajković leading a party in the coalition. Dajković is one of the more radical Serbian nationalist politicians in Montenegro and notoriously posts tweets on Twitter that deny the Montenegrin ethnicity and language and claim Montenegro as a 'Serbian Sparta'. The DF campaign, called "For the Future of Podgorica" mainly focuses on national topics, advocating for Christian conservative and Serbian nationalist values, but also advocates for overthrowing DPS due to corruption.

The DPS-led coalition is currently in power and is headed by Ivan Vuković. Vuković tries to distance his campaign from the notoriously corrupt national branch of DPS and focuses on local topics, with a green liberal platform. His campaign book goes over the changes in the last 4 years, and despite the two parties being strongly opposed to each other, DPS promises match the URA promises, although on a smaller scale.

SNP is running alone, and its campaign resembles the centre-left shift the party has been taking since entering the minority government. It promotes a green, 'smart city' campaign.

Reversal is a small anti-corruption and green movement aiming to end particracy. It has not made a lot of its views public due to the movement being very small and new. Along with Podgorica, it's participating in the Danilovgrad elections.

Saint Sava Serbian List is a small radical conservative, Christian fundamentalist and Serbian nationalist electoral list. Their arguments edge close to some of Dajković's rhetoric, and they barely suggest anything in local topics, only rallying support for the Serbian Orthodox Church, the majority church in Montenegro.

Results

Notes

References 

2022 elections in Europe
Local elections in Montenegro